Rainer Philipp (born 8 March 1950 in Bad Nauheim) is an ice hockey player who played for the West German national team. He won a bronze medal at the 1976 Winter Olympics.

References

External links
 
 
 
 

1950 births
Ice hockey players at the 1972 Winter Olympics
Ice hockey players at the 1976 Winter Olympics
Ice hockey players at the 1980 Winter Olympics
Kölner Haie players
Living people
Medalists at the 1976 Winter Olympics
Olympic bronze medalists for West Germany
Olympic ice hockey players of West Germany
Olympic medalists in ice hockey
People from Wetteraukreis
Sportspeople from Darmstadt (region)
West German ice hockey forwards